Sydney Banks (1917–2006) was a Canadian broadcaster and producer.

Sydney Banks may also refer to:

 Sydney Banks (1931–2009), Scottish-born, Canadian philosopher and author, see Health realization

See also
Sidney Banks, trainer in the 1947 St James's Place Festival Hunter Chase
Banks (surname)